James Vandaveer Heidinger (July 17, 1882 – March 22, 1945) was a U.S. Representative from Illinois.

He was born on a farm near Mount Erie, Illinois, he attended the rural schools, Northern Illinois Normal School, De Kalb, Illinois, and Valparaiso (Indiana) University. He taught in the rural schools of Wayne County, Illinois. He was graduated from Northern Illinois College of Law, Dixon, Illinois, in 1908. He was admitted to the bar the same year and commenced practice in Fairfield, Illinois. He was the county judge of Wayne County, Illinois from 1914 to 1926. He served as assistant attorney general of Illinois 1927-1933. He served as delegate to the Republican National Convention in 1928. He was an unsuccessful candidate for election to the Seventy-second and Seventy-fourth Congresses.

Heidinger was elected as a Republican to the Seventy-seventh, Seventy-eighth, and Seventy-ninth Congresses and served from January 3, 1941, until his death in Phoenix, Arizona from pulmonary fibrosis, on March 22, 1945.
He was interred in Maple Hill Cemetery, Fairfield, Illinois.

See also
 List of United States Congress members who died in office (1900–49)

References

Further reading

1882 births
1945 deaths
Illinois lawyers
Educators from Illinois
People from Wayne County, Illinois
Illinois state court judges
Republican Party members of the United States House of Representatives from Illinois
Valparaiso University alumni
20th-century American judges
20th-century American politicians
20th-century American lawyers